Minutillo is an Italian surname. Notable people with the surname include:

 Gastón Minutillo (born 1987), Argentine soccer player
 Mikey Minutillo (born 1991), American soccer player

Italian-language surnames